Uilson Pedruzzi de Oliveira (born 28 April 1994), simply known as Uilson, is a Brazilian footballer who plays for Coimbra as a goalkeeper.

Career
Born in Nanuque, Minas Gerais, Uilson joined Atlético Mineiro's youth setup in 2005, aged 11, after a brief stint at neighbouring América Mineiro. He made his professional – and Série A – debut on 25 October 2014, replacing field player Cesinha in a 3–2 home win against Sport Recife, after starter Victor was sent off.

On 7 December Uilson was handed his first start, playing the full 90 minutes in a 0–0 away draw against Botafogo.

He was part of the Brazil Olympic squad that won the gold medal at the 2016 Summer Olympics.

Career statistics

Notes

Honours

Club
Atlético Mineiro
Copa do Brasil: 2014
Campeonato Mineiro: 2015, 2017

International
Brazil
Olympic Gold Medal: 2016

References

External links
Atlético official profile 

Uilson at playmakerstats.com (English version of ogol.com.br)

1994 births
Living people
Sportspeople from Bahia
Brazilian footballers
Association football goalkeepers
Campeonato Brasileiro Série A players
Clube Atlético Mineiro players
Coimbra Esporte Clube players
Brazil youth international footballers
Brazilian people of Italian descent
Olympic footballers of Brazil
Footballers at the 2016 Summer Olympics
Olympic gold medalists for Brazil
Olympic medalists in football
Medalists at the 2016 Summer Olympics